George Henry Morland (died c. 1789) was a British genre painter.

Life
Morland was born early in the eighteenth century. His art at one time was popular, and some of his works, such as The Pretty Ballad Singer and The Fair Nun Unmasked, were engraved by Watson, and The Oyster Woman by Philip Dawe. The last of these pictures is now in the Glasgow Gallery. In 1760 he was assisted by a grant from the Incorporated Society of Artists. He lived on the south side of St. James's Square, and died in 1789 or after.

Family
His son Henry Robert Morland was father of George Morland.

References

Attribution

18th-century British painters
British male painters
1780s deaths
Year of birth unknown